The Roman Catholic Diocese of Ootacamund is a diocese located in the city of Ootacamund (Ooty) in the Ecclesiastical province of Madras and Mylapore in India.

 Bishops of Ootacamund Diocese (Latin Rite)
 Bishop Mar Antony Padiyara (later Cardinal) (3 July 1955 – 14 June 1970)
 Bishop Packiam Arokiaswamy (later Archbishop) (16 January 1971 – 6 December 1971)
 Bishop James Masilamony Arul Das (later Archbishop) (21 December 1973 – 11 May 1994)
 Bishop Antony Anandarayar (later Archbishop) (2 January 1997 – 10 June 2004)
 Bishop Arulappan Amalraj (30 June 2006 – present)

Saints and causes for canonisation
 Bl. Mary of the Passion established a convent and order in Ooty.

References

External links
 GCatholic.org 
 Catholic Hierarchy 
 Diocese website 

Roman Catholic dioceses in India
Christian organizations established in 1955
Roman Catholic dioceses and prelatures established in the 20th century
Christianity in Tamil Nadu
1955 establishments in Madras State